Ras-related protein Rab-15 is a protein that in humans is encoded by the RAB15 gene.

References

Further reading